Sutter Hill is an unincorporated community in Amador County, California.

See also
Sutter Hill Ventures

References

External links

Unincorporated communities in California
Unincorporated communities in Amador County, California